OpenC++ can refer to

OpenC++ is a software tool to parse and analyze C++ source code.
OpenC++ or OpenC is an extension by Nokia of the P.I.P.S. Is POSIX on Symbian library.